D. Miguel de Castro (1536-1625) was Bishop of Viseu in 1579, Archbishop of Lisbon in 1586, and later Viceroy of Portugal. He received his doctorate in Theology at Coimbra and was appointed Inquisitor of the Holy Office in 1556, eleven years later becoming a member of the General Council.

Biography
Protected by the Cardinal-King Henry of Portugal, he ascended to the prelacy of Viseu in 1579, and in 1585 is named Archbishop of Lisbon, successor to D. Jorge de Almeida.

He also directed the reprinting of the Constituições do Arcebispado de Lisboa "both the old and the extravagant." D. Miguel held high positions during the Philippine rule, being one of the Governors of the Kingdom in 1593.

A biography of Bartolomeu da Costa was dedicated to him, in 1611, by António Carvalho de Parada.

In 1615 he succeeded Bishop Pedro de Castilho as Viceroy of Portugal, a post he held for two years.

References

External links
 

1536 births
1625 deaths
Archbishops of Lisbon
17th-century Roman Catholic bishops in Portugal
University of Coimbra alumni
Bishops of Viseu